Mary Jo Bang (born October 22, 1946 in Waynesville, Missouri) is an American poet.

Life
Bang grew up in Ferguson, Missouri. She graduated from Northwestern University with a Bachelor's and Master's in sociology, from the Polytechnic of Central London with a Bachelor's in Photography, and from Columbia University, with an M.F.A. in Creative Writing (Poetry). Previously, she has taught at Columbia College, Yale University, The New School for Social Research, University of Montana, Columbia University and at Iowa's Writing Workshop. Bang is currently a professor at Washington University in St. Louis.

Her work has appeared in New American Writing, Paris Review, The New Yorker, A Public Space, The New Republic, Denver Quarterly, The New York Times, The New Yorker and Harvard Review.

Bang was the poetry co-editor of the Boston Review from 1995 to 2005. She was a judge for the 2004 James Laughlin Award.

She lives in St. Louis, Missouri.

Awards and recognitions
 RHINO Translation Prize (with Yuki Tanaka), 2020
 Gulf Coast Prize in Translation, 2018
Berlin Prize Fellowship, 2015
 American Library Association Notable Book, 2013
 American Poets Notable Book, 2012
 Paumanok Poetry Award, 2010
 100 Notable Books of 2008
Publishers Weekly; "2007 Best Books of the Year" St. Louis Post-Dispatch; "Most Recommended" National Book
 National Book Critics Circle Award, 2007
 Washington University Faculty Research Grant, Summer 2007, Summer 2014
 Bellagio Foundation Fellowship 2007
 Finalist, Anna Akhmatova Award 2006
 Bogliosco Foundation Fellowship 2005
 Poetry Society of America's Alice Fay di Castagnola Award 2005 (Fannie Howe, Judge) & 2002 (Brenda Hillman, Judge)
 Guggenheim Fellowship 2004
 Linda Hull Award, 2004
 Pushcart Prize 2003
 "Louise in Love" listed in: "Notable Books in 2001" National Book Critics Circle; "Best Books of 2001" St. Louis Post-Dispatch
University of Georgia’s Contemporary Poets Series Competition 2000 (Mark Strand, Judge)
 Hodder Fellowship, Princeton University 1999-2000
 Chateau Lavigny Fellowship 1999
Great Lakes Colleges Association New Writer's Award 1998
Yaddo Fellowship 1998
 "Apology for Want" listed in “Notable Books in 1997” by the National Book Critics Circle
 Bread Loaf Writers' Conference Fellowship, 1997
 Katharine Bakeless Nason Publication Prize 1996 (Edward Hirsh, Judge)
 MacDowell Colony Fellowship, 1996
 "Discovery" The Nation Poetry Award 1995
 Honorable Mention, Academy of American Poets Poetry Competition, 1995 (Robert Pinsky, Judge)
 Columbia University School of the Arts Dean's Award, 1994

Bibliography

Collections
 
 
 
 
 Allegory (2004)
 
 
 Let's say yes : chapbook (2011)
 Her head in a rabbit hole : chapbook (2006)
 The last two seconds : poems (2015)
 A doll for throwing : poems (2017)

In translation
*Eskapaden. Selected Poems. German/Engl.'' (Luxbooks, Wiesbaden 2010)

List of poems

Translations

Anthologies

References

External links
 "Mary Jo Bang Examines Grief's Poetic Form, the Elegy", NewsHour, PBS
 "Mary Jo Bang", Poetry Foundation

1946 births
Living people
Poets from Missouri
American women poets
Columbia University School of the Arts alumni
MacDowell Colony fellows
Northwestern University alumni
People from St. Louis County, Missouri
Princeton University fellows
Washington University in St. Louis faculty
Writers from Missouri
21st-century American poets
21st-century American women writers
The New Yorker people
People from Waynesville, Missouri
Translators of Dante Alighieri